Cricket Tasmania Premier League, or Tasmanian Premier Cricket, refers to the hierarchically graded cricket competitions played in Tasmania, Australia. The Cricket Tasmania Premier League comes under the administration of the Tasmanian Cricket Association (Cricket Tasmania).

Grade Cricket in Australia is the next level below First class cricket, and as such, Male and Female players seeking selection for Tasmania's representative sides, the Tasmanian Tigers, must first prove themselves in the Premier League Competition.

The club cricket competition in Tasmania is divided up into three main regional zones, South, North and North-west. Grade sides also compete for a number of competitions in first class cricket, one-day cricket and Twenty20 versions of cricket.

History

With the establishment of the STCA a structured form of competition between clubs started to evolve.  However, it was not until the 1869-70 season that a Premier Club was formally recognised, through the consequence of a series of Challenge matches between Derwent, Break o’Day and Wellington, which saw one club merge as the Champion.  It would take another twenty years before there was a formal club pennant competition played for premiership points.

Aside from the Challenge series the clubs played social engagements with minor clubs such as Albert, Military, Tradesmen, New Town, Waratah and St Johns to name a few.  Trial matches for selection in the Association team to play the Northern Association in the annual intra-colonial fixture, and matches between Hutchins School and the High School, were significant events played on the Battery Ground.

But with only one suitable senior playing field available on the Domain and matches often played over three successive Saturdays (with occasional mid-week afternoons allocated to achieve a result) there was great demand from other clubs to use the facility.  The playing schedule included specific dates for major matches such as the annual North v South fixture and, with intercolonial matches also slotted into the programme when arrangements were finalised there were rarely more than three meetings between the senior clubs each season.

Being able to commit to playing cricket was not easy for many Hobartians; in fact only men of substance were able to do so.  On occasions when a club was unable to raise sufficient players from its own ranks players from another club would fill the vacancies.  Names from Hutchins and High School dominated the scorecards.  It would be many years before labourers and the common folk would have both time and money to become members of the Association and senior clubs.

A fourth senior club, Lefroy, had a short existence but in 1889 the club, together with its assets and liabilities, was taken over by Break o’Day.  Perhaps the most significant part of the acquisition was  Charles Eady, then a lad of 19 years; he and Ken Burn (who played with Wellington) would become the two most significant cricketers produced by Tasmania for almost a century.

Break o’Day and Wellington, rather than Derwent, shared the spoils of victory until the introduction of District Cricket in 1905-06 when the three old clubs were disbanded and a pennant competition with three grades was implemented between five new clubs – North Hobart, South Hobart, East Hobart, West Hobart and New Town.

The Great War was devastating.  During this period the Southern Tasmanian Cricket League was formed to administer the game until the Tasmanian Cricket Association resumed control in 1919 when the district competition of pre-war days was abolished with the original clubs, Derwent, Break o’Day and Wellington, continuing on.  When the Defence Act was relaxed in 1923 district cricket was re-introduced but with only four clubs – Eastern Suburbs, South Hobart, North-West Hobart and New Town – none with a direct association with the former district clubs established in 1905.

In subsequent years other clubs were admitted; some remain while others disbanded or changed names.  Eastern Suburbs became Sandy Bay in 1926; Glenorchy and Kingston (later renamed as Kingborough) were admitted in 1931; Clarence (1956) and University (1961) followed and in 1987 South Hobart and Sandy Bay amalgamated.  Lindisfarne was admitted in 1992.

A system of Grade finals has been in place since 1954-55.  In 1967 club boundaries were abolished and the district structure was again replaced by club cricket.  The limited over one-day and T20 formats were incorporated into the competition in 2003 and 2010 respectively.

The Tasmanian Cricket Association Grade competition was renamed the Cricket Tasmania Premier League in 2010. There are now ten clubs playing in five senior Men's grades (1st, 2nd, 3rd, Under 17 and 15’s). In addition, all ten clubs field teams in a Women’s 1st Grade and under-pinning the CTPL Cricket Tasmania's Community Cricket team administers Junior and Youth Leagues for boys and girls from primary and secondary schools.

Chronological History Notes

Clubs

Premier League Clubs
Clarence District Cricket Club (CDCC)
Glenorchy Cricket Club (GCC)
Kingborough Cricket Club (KCC)
Lindisfarne Cricket Club (LCC)
New Town Cricket Club (NTCC)
North Hobart Cricket Club (NHCC)
South Hobart/Sandy Bay Cricket Club (SHSBCC)
University of Tasmania Cricket Club (UTCC)
Greater Northern Raiders (GNR) a representative side from the Northern Tasmanian Cricket Association and Cricket North West; the only side not from the Hobart area
Brighton District Cricket Club (BDCC)

Representative Sides

Chairman's XI
TCA
NTCA
NWTCA
Jamie Cox Plate XI
Tasmanian Under 19's

Competitions

Grade Cricket
Grade cricket is one level below first class cricket competition and consists of games played over at least two days, but sometimes, three, often played over two weekends. In Tasmania there are three senior grades, known simply as "1st Grade", "2nd Grade", and "3rd Grade", and two junior grades, "Under-17" and "Under-15". Historically, there have been "4th grade" and "5th grade" competitions.

2019/20 Winners: Lindisfarne Cricket Club

Kookaburra Cup
The Kookaburra Cup is Tasmania's grade cricket limited overs competition. Games are 50 overs per side, and are played in accordance with current ICC regulations for One Day International.
2006 Winners: Glenorchy Cricket Club
2007 Winners: South Hobart/Sandy Bay Cricket Club

Jamie Cox Plate
The Jamie Cox Plate is an opportunity for young Tasmanian players of talent to showcase their abilities. It was first held in 2003 and has since become an annual competition held between select XI's of talented players representing the TCA, NTCA, NWTCA and Tasmanian under-19 teams. 
Previous Winners:
2003-2004 - NTCA
2004-2005 - TCA
2005-2006 - TCA
2006-2007 - TCA

Grade Twenty/20 Comp
The Twenty/20 comp is a new competition held between Tasmanian club sides according to the rule of the innovative Twenty20 version of cricket. It is designed to equip developing players to play that version of the game at inter-state, and possibly international level later in their careers, as well as giving an exciting new attraction to the grade season.
2006 winners: University of Tasmania Cricket Club
2007 winners: South Hobart/Sandy Bay Cricket Club
2008 winners: South Hobart/Sandy Bay Cricket Club

Greater Northern Cup
In the current absence of an NTCA competition there is a combined table which incorporates the NTCA clubs and the NWTCA clubs and goes towards deciding an overall "Greater Northern" champion.

The Premier Club
The Premier Club is the list of clubs who have been TCA champions. Up to the end of the  2017/2018 season the complete list of the Premier Club looks like this:

North Hobart - 18
Break O'Day - 17
Wellington - 16
Glenorchy - 16
New Town - 13 (inc record seven in a row)
Clarence - 14
Kingborough - 10
University - 6
South Hobart - 5
East Hobart - 4
North West - 3
Sandy Bay - 3
Kingston - 3
Lindisfarne - 2
South Hobart Sandy Bay - 2
West Hobart - 1
East Suburbs - 1

See also
Grade cricket for like competitions in other states

External links
Cricket Tasmania Premier League Official Site

Grade cricket competitions in Australia
Cricket in Tasmania